Bruno Nunes de Barros (born 5 March 1995), known as Bruno Tubarão, is a Brazilian footballer who plays as a winger for Atlético Goianiense.

Club career
Bruno Tubarão started his career at Cabofriense, representing the club in the Campeonato Carioca between 2016 and 2018. He also spent time on loan at clubs in the lower divisions of the championship, before making a breakthrough loan move to Boa Esporte to be part of their 2018 Campeonato Brasileiro Série B squad.

Despite Boa Esporte's relegation, Bruno Tubarão was singled out and earned a move to Red Bull Brasil for 2019. He became part of the Red Bull Bragantino squad when Red Bull Brasil merged with Clube Atlético Bragantino in April 2019.

References

External links
 

Living people
1995 births
Brazilian footballers
Footballers from Rio de Janeiro (city)
Association football midfielders
Associação Desportiva Cabofriense players
Madureira Esporte Clube players
Sampaio Corrêa Futebol e Esporte players
Boa Esporte Clube players
Red Bull Brasil players
Red Bull Bragantino players
CR Vasco da Gama players
Atlético Clube Goianiense players
Campeonato Brasileiro Série A players
Campeonato Brasileiro Série B players